In computing, tombstone diagrams (or T-diagrams) consist of a set of “puzzle pieces” representing compilers and other related language processing programs. They are used to illustrate and reason about transformations from a source language (left of T) to a target language (right of T) realised in an implementation language (bottom of T). They are most commonly found describing complicated processes for bootstrapping, porting, and self-compiling of compilers, interpreters, and macro-processors.

T-diagrams were first used for describing bootstrapping and cross-compiling compilers by Harvey Bratman in 1961, who reshaped the diagrams originally introduced by Strong et al. (1958) to illustrate UNCOL.  Later on, others, including McKeeman et al.  and P.D. Terry, explained the usage of T-diagrams with further detail. T-diagrams are also now used to describe client-server interconnectivity on the World Wide Web. A teaching tool TDiag has been implemented at Leipzig University, Germany.

See also
 Bootstrapping (compilers)

References

Compilers
Compiler construction
Computer programming
Self-hosting software
Program transformation